Saratoga Performing Arts Center (SPAC) is a large amphitheatre located in Saratoga Springs, New York, on the grounds of Saratoga Spa State Park. It presents summer performances of classical music, jazz, pop and rock, country, comedy, dance, opera, as well as a Wine & Food Festival. It opened on July 9, 1966, with a presentation of George Balanchine's A Midsummer Night's Dream by the New York City Ballet.

The Center is the official summer home of the New York City Ballet and the Philadelphia Orchestra, both of which are in residence for two or three weeks during the summer.

SPAC also serves as the common venue for high school graduations, particularly for Saratoga Springs, Burnt Hills-Ballston Lake, Shenendehowa, and Ballston Spa High Schools. Skidmore College commencement exercises also take place at the venue.

Saratoga Performing Arts Center, Inc. is a non-profit charitable corporation that runs the arts center. It holds a 50-year renewable lease with the State of New York, which owns the land, theaters and buildings that comprise the center. SPAC subcontracts with Live Nation, which organizes and presents the popular music and rock concerts every summer. The income derived from the Live Nation contract goes towards supporting the classical arts presentations.

History
In early February 1961, Albany newspaperman Duane La Fleche noted a wire service report about a group hoping to entice the New York Philharmonic to make Stowe, Vermont its summer residence.  La Fleche proposed that the group stay in New York State and perform in Saratoga Springs.  Local civic, cultural, and legislative leaders, who had previously considered a Saratoga Arts Center an interesting possibility, began to design the facility.  Within a week, they held their first meeting; within a month they were focusing on Saratoga Spa State Park as the site, had won the support of State Conservation Commissioner Harold Wilm, and began discussions with both the New York Philharmonic and New York City Ballet.

By summer 1963, contributions from Rockefeller Brothers Fund and New York State supplemented community support to create Saratoga Performing Arts Center.  In June 1964, Governor Nelson A. Rockefeller mounted a bulldozer to break the first yard of ground.  More than 410 workdays followed: 300 workers clocked 136,000 hours to complete the 5,103-seat, 10-story amphitheater (original layout of the venue did not include a festival lawn; the lawn, which holds 20,000, was added later).

Harry Belafonte was the first non-classical performer to perform at SPAC, in 1967. Then on September 1, 1968 The Doors gave a performance at SPAC, which began a tradition of bringing top pop and rock acts to the amphitheater including Jackson Browne (who recorded "Rosie" backstage in 1977), Whitney Houston (who filmed her televised MTV VMA performance of "I Wanna Dance With Somebody", as well as the official music video for "Didn't We Almost Have It All" on stage in 1987). Other notable pop-rock acts that have performed at SPAC include Phish, Pretenders, Santana, Olivia Newton-John,Tina Turner, Guns N' Roses, Coldplay, Aretha Franklin, O.A.R., Rush, Demi Lovato, KISS, Dave Matthews Band, Kings of Leon, blink-182, Fall Out Boy, Paramore, Aerosmith, Toby Keith, Train, Maroon 5, Britney Spears, Ray LaMontagne, Prince, Missy Elliott, Pearl Jam, Jay-Z, Bruce Springsteen, Pink Floyd, Avril Lavigne, John Mayer, Nicki Minaj, Sheryl Crow, 50 Cent, Paul Simon, Selena Gomez, Tom Petty, Drake, The Cars, Snoop Dogg, The B-52's, Def Leppard, The Black Eyed Peas, Ray Charles, Dire Straits, Christina Aguilera, The Beach Boys, 5 Seconds of Summer, Foreigner, Heart, Alter Bridge, Imagine Dragons, Breaking Benjamin, Saint Asonia, Disturbed, Slipknot, Gojira, Three Days Grace, Chevelle, Journey, Wiz Khalifa, John Mellencamp, Elton John, Justin Bieber, Janet Jackson, and The Grateful Dead (1983 being considered one of their classics).

Farm Aid was held here in 2013. Dave Matthews, John Mellencamp, Neil Young, and Willie Nelson headlined.

Past presidents of SPAC include Margaretta "Happy" Rockefeller and Lillian Bostwick Phipps.  Currently, the President of the non-profit corporation also acts as the executive director.

Present-day performances
 SPAC has been the summer home for the New York City Ballet and The Philadelphia Orchestra for several decades. Well-known classical music soloists, such as Yo-Yo Ma, Gil Shaham, Yuja Wang, and Sarah Chang, annually perform major concerts at this venue.

The Philadelphia Orchestra's most well-attended performance is its annual Tchaikovsky Spectacular, which includes the 1812 Overture and one or two well-known concerts.

A feature of each summer is the Jazz Festival, which presents major and emerging jazz artists on two stages.

The Saratoga Chamber Music Festival, under the direction of Canadian violinist, Chantal Juillet, presents programs in the Spa Little Theatre. In 2006, the composer-in-residence was Bright Sheng.

Opera performances are given by the Opera Saratoga (formerly Lake George Opera).

The Martha Graham Dance Company performed at SPAC during its 2008 residency at Skidmore College.

SPAC is also a venue for non-classical concerts, which are booked exclusively by Live Nation, a leading concert promotion company in America. Acts such as Cardi B, Imagine Dragons and Legend Jennifer Lopez have performed at the Center.

Popular rock band Phish has played the venue 20 times beginning in 1992. The band has played at SPAC multiple times since its 2009 return including three-night runs in 2012, 2013, 2014, and 2016.

Sting performed during his Symphonicities Tour on July 31, 2010, along with the Royal Philharmonic Orchestra.

Dave Matthews Band has played at the venue a total of 42 times. They recorded the live album Live Trax 11 in 2000. The band has sold out more concerts than any other artist at the venue, with eleven. 

For at least two decades, SPAC has hosted the School of Orchestral Studies (SOS) for the New York State Summer School of the Arts (NYSSSA) program. Approximately 115 high school-age students of NYSSSA's SOS attend concert performances during the summer as part of an intensive study of music performance, study with members of the Philadelphia Orchestra, and give a culminating performance in the amphitheater.

SPAC is headed by Elizabeth Sobol. Over 200 seasonal employees keep the venue running through the summer season.

SPAC's largest attended performance in its history was by The Grateful Dead in 1985, where a total of 40,231 fans showed up to see the band. Since the show, SPAC limits its capacity to 25,103.

In August 2020, The Performing Arts Center revealed "SPAC @ Home: Concert Series," featuring appearances by violinist Joshua Bell along with the pianist Peter Dugan (SEP 12) and the Time For Three (SEP 19) genre crossing ensemble. Live on SPAC grounds and at the Skidmore College's Arthur Zankel Music Center.

See also
 List of contemporary amphitheatres
Live Nation

References

External links

Saratoga Performing Arts Center Seating Chart

Amphitheaters in the United States
Theatres in New York (state)
Buildings and structures in Saratoga Springs, New York
Performing arts centers in New York (state)
Tourist attractions in Saratoga Springs, New York